Plagiopsetta is a genus of crested flounders native to the western Pacific Ocean.

Species
There are currently three recognized species in this genus:
 Plagiopsetta glossa V. Franz, 1910 (Tongue flatfish)
 Plagiopsetta gracilis Mihara & Amaoka, 2004
 Plagiopsetta stigmosa Mihara & Amaoka, 2004

References

Samaridae
Marine fish genera